Mexicana Universal 2018 is the 1st edition of the Mexicana Universal beauty pageant, formerly called Nuestra Belleza Mexico until 2017. This edition will feature several changes. Thirty-two participants, one per state, compete for the Title. The competition is scheduled for June 10, 2018. Denisse Franco, Nuestra Belleza México 2017, crown her successor  at the end of the event. The winner will represent Mexico at Miss Universe 2018.

Results

Mexicana Universal

Contestants
32 contestants has been confirmed:

References

External links
Official Website
El Universal Mexicana Universal Website

2018 beauty pageants
Beauty pageants in Mexico
Mexicana Universal
2018 in Mexico